Isabella Camera d'Afflitto (born 1948 in Salerno) is an Italian academic and translator, regarded as one of Italy's leading Arabists. She teaches modern Arabic literature at La Sapienza University in Rome, and has written numerous books and scholarly articles on the subject.

She was awarded the Grinzane Cavour Prize in 2006. She has also served on the judging panel of the Arabic Booker Prize.

References

Academic staff of the Sapienza University of Rome
Italian Arabists